Rilmazolam, is a benzodiazepine derivative which acts as a sedative and hypnotic drug, and the active metabolite of the drug Rilmazafone. It has never been developed for medical uses, yet the aforementioned prodrug is an approved medication in Japan.

See also
 Flutazolam
 Etizolam
 Phenazepam
 Mexazolam
 Rilmazafone

References 

GABAA receptor positive allosteric modulators
Triazolobenzodiazepines